John Wayne Kelsey (born November 22, 1952) is a former American football tight end in the World Football League (WFL) for The Hawaiians. He played college football at the University of Missouri.

Early years
Kelsey attended Belton High School. He accepted a football scholarship from the University of Missouri. As a sophomore, he posted 11 receptions for 141 yards (fourth on the team) and one touchdown. 

As a junior, he was passed on the depth chat by John Muse and only had 3 receptions for 63 yards. As a senior, he recorded 7 receptions for 71	yards and 2 touchdowns.

Professional career
Kelsey was selected by the Dallas Cowboys in the fifth round (126th overall) of the 1974 NFL Draft. He instead opted to sign with The Hawaiians of the World Football League. He was the starter at tight end, registering 37 receptions for 505 yards (13.6-yard avg.) and 6 touchdowns. He played until the league folded mid-way through the 1975 season.

References

External links
John Kelsey Stats

1952 births
Living people
Players of American football from Austin, Texas
American football tight ends
Missouri Tigers football players
The Hawaiians players